Tiago Ferreira may refer to:

Tiago Ferreira (cyclist), Portuguese mountain biker
Tiago Ferreira (footballer, born 1975), Portuguese footballer
Tiago Ferreira (footballer, born 1993), Portuguese footballer

See also
Jacksen Ferreira Tiago, Brazilian footballer